Donoho Creek is a  long 1st order tributary to the Cape Fear River in Bladen County, North Carolina.  This is the only stream of this name in the United States.

Course
Donoho Creek rises on the Carvers Creek divide about 1 mile northwest of Westbrook, North Carolina.  Donoho Creek then flows southeast to join the Cape Fear River about 0.25 miles northeast of Westbrook.

Watershed
Donoho Creek drains  of area, receives about 50.3 in/year of precipitation, has a wetness index of 552.49 and is about 20% forested.

See also
List of rivers of North Carolina

References

Rivers of North Carolina
Rivers of Bladen County, North Carolina
Tributaries of the Cape Fear River